

Rima is the former capital of the Zayul in the southeastern Tibet Autonomous Region of China. It is on the border with India's Arunachal Pradesh at the confluence of the Rongto Chu and Zayul Chu rivers, which join to form the Zayul River (or Lohit River) before it flows into Arunachal Pradesh. Rima was a notable border trading town, which the British contemplated as a location for a trade mart in the Lhasa Convention.

References

Bibliography
 
 
 

Populated places in Nyingchi